Feaster is a surname that many (but not all) Pfisters from Bavaria and Switzerland took after immigrating to the United States. Notable people with the name feasted include:

Allison Feaster, WNBA player with the Indiana Fever
Jay Feaster, executive with the National Hockey League
Rob Feaster, American expatriate professional basketball player
Tavien Feaster (born 1997), American football player

References

Other sources
 "The Robert Coleman Family from Virginia to Texas 1652-1965" by Governor James P. Coleman

External links
 Univ. of South Carolina Papers on Feaster, Coleman, and Mobley families